The Texas Company Building, located at 1111 Rusk (720 Jacinto) in Houston, Texas, was listed on the National Register of Historic Places on April 2, 2003.

The 13-story structure opened in 1915 as home of the Texas Company.  The New York firm of Warren and Wetmore designed the building in the Renaissance Revival style with Beaux-Arts accents.  The exterior is faced with brick, terra cotta and Bedford limestone and features vaulted arcades supported by Tuscan columns along its Rusk and San Jacinto Street façades.

The Texas Company became Texaco in 1959 and continued to occupy the building until 1989 when it moved to another facility.  To accommodate growth, the company expanded the structure three times between 1936 and 1975.

Since the building became vacant, developers proposed several plans to reuse it, however none were successful.  In 2011, a development consortium created a plan for approximately 300 apartments with retail space and parking.  They began work in 2013 and have demolished part of the structure but kept the 13-story section, the 1936 annex and the 16-story expansion added in 1958.  Eventual plans call for a 38-story tower behind the historic structure.

The management expects to open the completed building at the end of 2015.

See also
 National Register of Historic Places listings in Harris County, Texas

References

Beaux-Arts architecture in Texas
Buildings and structures in Houston
Commercial buildings completed in 1915
National Register of Historic Places in Houston
Office buildings on the National Register of Historic Places in Texas